Chamsuri-class patrol vessels (Hangul: 참수리급 고속정) are naval boats that function as patrol boats. These entered service with the Republic of Korea Navy in the 1970s, and have since seen service with three other navies, of which the Philippine Navy is currently the largest import user.

These boats were built by the Hanjin Industrial SB, Chinhae, and Korea SB & Eng. Masan shipyards.

These boats, also referred to as patrol killer medium "PKM", were built in two batches: the 201 series, and the more heavily armed 301 series. Early PKM 201 series boats were initially armed with one 40 mm/60 Bofors Mk.3, one twin 30 mm/75 Emerlec EX-30, and two 20 mm/70 Mk.10 AA. Late PKM 201 boats were armed with one twin 30 mm/75 Emerlec EX-30, one or two turreted single 20 mm Vulcan Gatlings, and two single 12.7 mm machine guns. The PKM 301 boats were armed with one 40 mm/60 Bofors in a fully enclosed mount, two turreted single 20 mm Vulcan Gatlings, and two single 12.7 mm machine guns (before the Second Battle of Yeonpyeong two single 7.62 mm M60 machine guns).

Users 
 
  Bangladesh - Titas class
  East Timor - Three examples, sub-class unknown
  Ghana - Stephen Otu class
  Kazakhstan - 031 class
  Philippines - 
  South Korea - Chamsuri class

In Bangladeshi service 

The Bangladesh Navy operates four PKMs. The first two (P1011 and P1012) were transferred from South Korea in 2000. Another two (P1013 & P1014) entered service in 2004.
P1011 Titas (ex-PKM-2??)
P1012 Kusiyara (ex-PKM-2??)
P1013 Chitra (ex-PKM-2??)
P1014 Dhansiri (ex-PKM-2??)

In Timorese service 
One naval and two coast guard units were transferred by South Korea to the Naval Component of East Timor's F-FDTL in September 2011, apparently on the basis of a transfer agreement signed in Seoul the previous month. 
They have been rechristened Kamenassa, Dili and Hera, respectively. Sub-class and original pennant numbers are currently unknown.
P1?? Kamenassa 
P1?? Dili      
P1?? Hera

In Ghanaian service
One vessel was transferred in 2011.
 P33 (ex PKM 237)

In Kazakh service 

Kazakhstan received three PKMs in 2006. These were purchased for a token amount of $100 per ship.
RK-031 (ex-PKM-2??)
RK-032 (ex-PKM-2??)
RK-033 (ex-PKM-233)

In Philippine service 

At least eight PKMs were transferred to the Philippines. The first five, PKM 225, 226, 229, 231, and 235, were transferred in 1995. Four were commissioned the following year, with one (ex-PKM 235) cannibalized for spare parts. Another unit was transferred in 1998.  An additional two ships, PKM 223 and PKM 232, were acquired in 2006.

These are listed below:

 (ex-PKM 225) 
 (ex-PKM 226)
 (ex-PKM 229)
 (ex-PKM 231)
BRP Ramon Aguirre (PG-115) (ex-PKM 235)

 (ex-PKM 232)
 (ex-PKM 223)

As of 1 March 2021, all ships of the class have been withdrawn from active service in the Philippine Navy.

References

External links
 Naval Institute Guide to Combat Fleets
 Chamsuri Patrol Vessel image (description in Korean)
 Republic of Korea's Navy: Western Sea Engagement

Patrol vessels of the Republic of Korea Navy
Patrol boat classes